Bonaventura may refer to:

 Bonaventura (given name), given name
 Bonaventura (surname), surname
 Bonaventura (VTA), light-rail station in San Jose, United States of America
 Signor Bonaventura, an Italian comic strip
 Bonaventura Heinz House (first), in the West End of Davenport, listed on the NRHP from 1984 to 2005
 Bonaventura Heinz House (second), historic building located in the West End of Davenport, listed on HRHP from 1983
 CVV 8 Bonaventura, Italian two-seat competition glider designed during the 1950s and produced in 50 unities

See also 

 Buenaventura (disambiguation)
 Bonaventure (disambiguation)